The 2022 season was the Washington Commanders' 91st in the National Football League (NFL) and their third under head coach Ron Rivera. This was the team's first season under the Commanders branding, with new logos and uniforms being introduced after temporarily playing as the Washington Football Team for the previous two seasons following the retirement of the Redskins branding in 2020. The team placed fourth in the NFC East and missed the playoffs with an 8–8–1 record. Wide receiver Terry McLaurin, defensive tackles Jonathan Allen and Daron Payne, punter Tress Way, and special teamer Jeremy Reaves made the 2023 Pro Bowl, with Reaves also being named first-team All-Pro.

Washington traded for Indianapolis Colts quarterback Carson Wentz in the offseason, who started the season 2–4 before being replaced by Taylor Heinicke after a finger injury. The team then went on a 5–3–1 run under Heinicke, improving upon their record from the previous season with a Week 13 tie against the New York Giants, but missed the playoffs for a second consecutive season after a loss to the Cleveland Browns in Week 17, despite finishing with a non-losing record for the first time since 2016. Wentz started again in Week 17 but was benched for the season finale due to poor performance in favor of rookie Sam Howell.

The Commanders were the first team since their 2008 squad and the 2008 New Orleans Saints to finish last in their division with a non-losing record.

Draft

Draft trades

Staff

Roster

Schedule

Preseason

Regular season

Note: Intra-division opponents are in bold text.

Game summaries

Week 1: vs. Jacksonville Jaguars

In their first ever game as the Washington Commanders, Carson Wentz threw for 313 yards and four touchdowns, including two to first-round rookie WR Jahan Dotson, who was named Pepsi NFL Rookie of the Week. Washington opened a 14–3 half time lead thanks to TD's from Curtis Samuel and Dotson. The Jaguars then scored 19 unanswered points thanks to two TD's from James Robinson and a couple of field goals. This was aided by two interceptions thrown by Wentz on consecutive pass attempts, the second caught by 2022 first overall draft pick Travon Walker. Wentz responded by leading the Commanders on two TD drives to win the game 28–22.

Week 2: at Detroit Lions

The Commanders 22–0 halftime deficit was too much to overcome despite their valiant efforts in the second half. Jahan Dotson scored a touchdown for the second consecutive game, but Joey Slye missed the extra point to make it a one-possession game and sealed the victory for the Lions. Carson Wentz threw for 337 yards and 3 touchdowns. Lions wide receiver Amon-Ra St. Brown had two touchdown catches.

Week 3: vs. Philadelphia Eagles

In his first game against the Eagles since being traded away from them, Carson Wentz was sacked nine times and the Commanders had only 47 yards of total offense and trailed 24–0 at halftime. Daron Payne tacked Boston Scott for a safety to make the score 24–2. Antonio Gibson scored a touchdown in the final two minutes to make the final score 24–8.

Week 4: at Dallas Cowboys

Week 5: vs. Tennessee Titans

Week 6: at Chicago Bears

Week 7: vs. Green Bay Packers

Week 8: at Indianapolis Colts

Washington overcame a 16–7 fourth quarter deficit to spoil Indianapolis Colts quarterback Sam Ehlinger's first career NFL start. Late in the fourth quarter with Washington trailing 16–10, Taylor Heinicke led a 9-play, 89-yard touchdown drive to win the game. This included a 33-yard completion to Terry McLaurin, who won a contested ball against Stephon Gillmore to set up Washington on the Indianapolis 1-yard line. Heinicke would then run a quarterback sneak to score the winning touchdown. Washington's defense also forced two fumbles on Ehlinger and Jonathan Taylor.

Week 9: vs. Minnesota Vikings

Vikings quarterback Kirk Cousins made his first return to Washington since leaving the team following the 2017 season. Cousins previously played for Washington, then known as the Redskins, from 2012–2017, was their primary starter from 2015–2017 and earned a Pro Bowl berth once in that span. Vikings head coach and former Redskins quarterbacks coach/offensive coordinator Kevin O'Connell previously mentored Cousins in the nation's capital during the 2017 season, Cousin's final season in the burgundy and gold. Washington was unable to hold onto a 17–7 fourth quarter lead as Kirk Cousins led the Minnesota Vikings to a 20–17 victory on a last-second Greg Joseph field goal. In the fourth quarter, Taylor Heinicke threw a critical interception to safety Harrison Smith that set up Minnesota deep in Washington territory. This led to Cousins throwing a touchdown to Dalvin Cook to tie the game at 17. After Washington failed to score on their next drive, Cousins led the Vikings into the Washington red zone. On fourth and goal with less than 2 minutes in the game, the Vikings took the lead on a field goal, but Washington backup defensive lineman John Ridgeway III committed a personal foul that granted the Vikings a first down. The Vikings then kicked a winning field goal with less than 15 seconds left.

Week 10: at Philadelphia Eagles

In a road divisional Monday Night Football matchup against the 8–0 Philadelphia Eagles, Washington had 40 minutes of time of possession to the Eagles 20, converted 12 of 21 third downs, and forced 4 turnovers to hand the them their first loss of the season, avenging their Week 3 loss to Philadelphia and picking up their fourth win in five games. It marked the second time in three seasons that Washington defeated the last undefeated team; they also defeated the 11–0 Pittsburgh Steelers in 2020. With Washington leading 26–21 less than two minutes remaining in the game, Eagles defensive end Brandon Graham committed a personal foul on a late hit on quarterback Taylor Heinicke that allowed Washington to convert a third down and run the game clock down, before sealing the 32–21 upset victory with a fumble return touchdown by Casey Toohill on the game's final play. Running backs Antonio Gibson and Brian Robinson Jr. each scored a rushing touchdown, and Terry McLaurin contributed 128 receiving yards. Kicker Joey Slye also had a large impact, making four field goals including from 58 (a career-long) and 55 yards. This win also marked the first time since 2014 that Washington had split their season series with Philadelphia.

Week 11: at Houston Texans

Washington carried its momentum from their upset win over Philadelphia the prior week and dominated the struggling Houston Texans for their fifth win in their past six games.  The Commanders dominated on defense in the first half, restricting the Houston offense to a total of 5 yards at halftime.  Washington had a 20–0 half time thanks to a Kendall Fuller 37 yard pick 6 on the first Houston drive (the first of his career), a 10 yard Curtis Samuel run and two field goals.  The second half was a turgid affair with Houston eventually getting on the board and ending up scoring with a Davis Mills 4 yard TD run.

Week 12: vs. Atlanta Falcons

Despite giving up 167 rushing yards in the game, the Commanders held off the Falcons with a late interception for their sixth win in seven games. Brian Robinson Jr., who had his first 100-yard rushing game in his career, caught the first touchdown of the game to give Washington a 7–3 lead. Atlanta reclaimed the lead in the 2nd before Washington answered with a 30-yard field goal by Joey Slye to tie the game 10–10 before halftime. In the third, Taylor Heinicke threw his second touchdown of the game to John Bates to give Washington a 16–10 lead they would never relinquish. After both teams traded field goals to make it 19–13, Atlanta drove down to the Washington 4-yard line to try and win the game, but Mariota had his pass deflected at the line of scrimmage by Daron Payne before Kendall Fuller intercepted it in the endzone, sealing the victory for the Commanders.

Week 13: at New York Giants

The Commanders tied for the first time since 2016, when the team was known as the Redskins. They dropped to 7–5–1.

Week 15: vs. New York Giants

Week 16: at San Francisco 49ers

Week 17: vs. Cleveland Browns

Carson Wentz returned to the starting position this week but would end up losing to the Browns, which eliminated them from playoff contention for a second consecutive season.

Week 18: vs. Dallas Cowboys

Washington ended their inaugural season as the Commanders on a positive note in a rout of the rival Dallas Cowboys. Rookie quarterback Sam Howell made his NFL debut and went 11 of 19 passing for 169 yards, a touchdown and an interception, as well as registering 35 yards on five carries with a touchdown. This game featured the No. 9 jersey number retirement of legendary Redskins quarterback Sonny Jurgensen. In addition to quarterbacking for Washington, Jurgensen was a part of the famous trio of Jurgensen, Sam Huff, and Frank Herzog, all of whom helmed the radio broadcast for the franchise together from 1981–2004.

Standings

Division

Conference

References

External links
 

Washington
Washington Commanders seasons
Washington Commanders